Kim Sung-kyu (born January 6, 1986) is a South Korean actor. He is best known for his roles in crime thriller The Outlaws (2017) and in the Netflix series Kingdom (2019).

Filmography

Film

Television series

Theater

Awards and nominations

References

External links 
 
 

1986 births
Living people
Daejin University alumni
South Korean male television actors
South Korean male film actors
South Korean male stage actors
21st-century South Korean male actors